Ian Gardner (born 19 January 1937) is  a former Australian rules footballer who played with Richmond in the Victorian Football League (VFL).

Notes

External links 
		

Living people
1937 births
Australian rules footballers from Victoria (Australia)
Richmond Football Club players
Oakleigh Football Club players